These are the official results of the Women's 200 metres event at the 1994 European Championships in Helsinki, Finland, held at Helsinki Olympic Stadium on 10 and 11 August 1994.

Medalists

Results

Final
11 August
Wind: 0.2 m/s

Semi-finals
11 August

Semi-final 1
Wind: 0.3 m/s

Semi-final 2
Wind: 1.4 m/s

Heats
10 August

Heat 1
Wind: -2.1 m/s

Heat 2
Wind: 0.3 m/s

Heat 3
Wind: -0.3 m/s

Heat 4
Wind: -1.7 m/s

Participation
According to an unofficial count, 32 athletes from 19 countries participated in the event.

 (1)
 (1)
 (1)
 (1)
 (3)
 (1)
 (3)
 (1)
 (1)
 (1)
 (1)
 (1)
 (1)
 (3)
 (2)
 (3)
 (1)
 (3)
 (3)

See also
 1990 Women's European Championships 200 metres (Split)
 1991 Women's World Championships 200 metres (Tokyo)
 1992 Women's Olympic 200 metres (Barcelona)
 1993 Women's World Championships 200 metres (Stuttgart)
 1995 Women's World Championships 200 metres (Gothenburg)
 1996 Women's Olympic 200 metres (Atlanta)
 1998 Women's European Championships 200 metres (Budapest)

References

 Results

200
200 metres at the European Athletics Championships
1994 in women's athletics